Myrina may refer to:

 Places and jurisdictions 
 Myrina, Greece, capital of the Greek island of Lemnos
 Myrina (Aeolis), in Mysia, also called Sebastopolis, ancient city and bishopric on the coast of Mysia (now in Turkey)
 Myrina (Crete), a town of ancient Crete

Other 
 Myrina (mythology), name of several female characters in Greek mythology
 Myrina (butterfly), a genus of butterflies
 Myrina, the first supertanker built in the UK